The Red Poppy or sometimes The Red Flower is a ballet in three acts and eight tableaux with an apotheosis, with a score written by Reinhold Glière and libretto by Mikhail Kurilko. This ballet was created in 1927 as the first Soviet ballet with a modern revolutionary theme. Possibly the most famous dance from this ballet is the Sailors Dance, sometimes referred to as the "Russian Sailors Dance" (although it is described as "Dance of the Sailors from the Soviet Ship" in the score and libretto). It is this musical selection for which Glière is perhaps best known. There have been four main versions of The Red Poppy.

History

Original version (1927) 

The original version of The Red Poppy was choreographed by Lev Lashchiline (1st and 3rd Acts) and Vasily Tikhomirov (2nd Act). The first performance was on 14 June 1927 in the Bolshoi Theatre (which at the time under Soviet rule had been renamed "First People's State Theatre for Opera and Ballet"). The orchestra was led by Yuri Fayer. The ballet's 100th performance in Moscow occurred on 23 December 1928.

This production was staged in 1928 and 1930 in Sverdlovsk, and in 1928, 1949, and 1958 in Saratov. The Leningradsky Theatre of opera and ballet staged the ballet in 1929 in Leningrad, adding several dances to the production. The original version was performed in 1941 and 1950 in Gorky; in 1946 in Baku by the Azerbaijan State Academic Opera and Ballet Theatre; and in 1949 and 1958 by the Kirov Ballet.

In 1943, the Ballet Russe de Monte-Carlo staged a one-act version of the ballet in the Public Music Hall, Cleveland, Ohio. Premiering on October 9, 1943, the production was staged by Igor Schwezoff, with decor by Boris Aronson. Since World War II was being fought at the time, with the Soviets and Americans allied, the villain Li-Chan-Fou was changed to a Japanese bar owner. The group of Soviet sailors now included British and Americans as well.

The Red Flower (1957) 
In 1957, Vasily Tikhomirov and Mikhail Kurilko staged an expanded version of the ballet. Renamed The Red Flower (to avoid the association with opium), the number of scenes ("tableaux") was increased from 8 to 13. It was first performed on 24 November 1957 in the Bolshoi Theatre.

Lavrovsky version (1949) 
In 1949 a new version of The Red Poppy was choreographed by Leonid Lavrovsky. The scenario was rewritten by Aleksey Yermolayev, and the ballet was first performed on 30 December 1949 in the Bolshoi Theatre. The 1949 version introduced a new character, Ma Lichen.

Androsov version (2010) 

On 12 February 2010, a new production of The Red Poppy, with choreography by Nikolay Androsov, was performed at Teatro dell'Opera di Roma. Scenery and costumes by Elena Puliti, conductor Andre Anichanov, musical cooperation from Francesco Sodini, and director of production Beppe Menegatti. This version introduced a new character,  Nüwa, goddess of fertility. A new production of this version is expected on June 13, 2015, at the Rostov State Opera and Ballet (Musical) Theatre, in Rostov-on-Don.

Vasiliev version (2010) 
Also in 2010, a new production choreographed by Vladimir Vasiliev (who also did scenario editing and scenery), with costumes by Maria Vol'skaya, and music director and conducting by Anatoly Chepurnoy, was performed on 23 November at the Krasnoyarsk Ballet and Opera Theater.

Other performances 
 1949 in Perm
 1950 and 1961 in Kuybyshev
 1950 in Novosibirsk
 1954 in Bratislava, Slovak National Theatre
 1962 in Volgograd

Synopsis 
The ballet takes place at a seaport in 1920s-era Republican China. Ships carrying sailors from many lands, including the Soviet Union, are docked in a Chinese seaport. The Captain of the Soviet Ship notices a group of half-starved, overworked coolies being brutally driven to work even harder by their cruel harbormaster.

One night while dancing for the sailors aboard the ship, the beautiful Taï-Choa (Pinyin: Taohua) notices the Soviet Captain trying to rescue the poor Coolies from the Harbormaster. Impressed by the captain's act of kindness she gives him a red poppy as a symbol of her love.

When Taï-Choa's fiancé, the adventurer Li-Chan-Fou learns of this, he is jealous and orders her to kill the captain. She refuses, and is later killed when a riot breaks out on the dock — thus sacrificing her life for the captain. As she dies, she gives another red poppy flower to a young Chinese girl as a sign of love and freedom.

Structure

Act One 
      First Tableau
  No. 1 Introduction
  No. 2 Unloading the Soviet Ship (Work of the Coolies)
  No. 3 Restaurant Scene
  No. 4 Dance of the Malaysian Women
      Scene and Exit of the Malaysian Women
  No. 5 Taï-Choa's Entrance
  No. 6 Fan Dance
  No. 7 Scene After Fan Dance
  No. 8 Dance in the Restaurant
  No. 9 Entrance of the Adventurer
  No. 10 Coolie's Work
  No. 11 Commotion in the Crowd. Arrival of the Captain of the Soviet Ship
  No. 12 Work of the Soviet Sailors
  No. 13 Scene of Taï-Choa with the Captain and the Adventurer
  No. 14 Dance of the Golden Thimbles
  No. 15 Exit of Taï-Choa
  No. 16 Victory Dance of the Coolies
  No. 17 Dance of Sailors from Different Nations
  No. 18 Dance of the Sailors from the Soviet Ship — Russian Song: Yablochko ("Little Apple")

Act Two 
      Second Tableau
 No. 19 Introduction
 No. 20 Scene in the Opium Den
 No. 21 Dance of the Chinese Women
 No. 22 Exit of the Chinese Women
 No. 23 Conspiracy Scene
 No. 24 Taï-Choa's Anguish
 No. 25 Taï-Choa Smokes Opium
      Third Tableau
 No. 26 Taï-Choa's Dream and Visions
 No. 27 Adagio (Four Goddesses)
 No. 28   a) Cortege   b) Sword Dance
      Fourth Tableau
 No. 29 Phoenix
 No. 30 Adagio of the Phoenix
      Fifth Tableau
 No. 31 Butterfly and Lotus Dance
 No. 32 Grand Adagio in E Major
 No. 33 Poppy Dance
 No. 34 Phoenix Variation
 No. 35 Taï-Choa's Variation (Xylophone Solo)
 No. 36 Dance of the Chinese Saltimbanque
 No. 37 Coda
 No. 38 The Red Barque

Act Three 
      Sixth Tableau
 No. 39 Introduction
 No. 40 Charleston
 No. 41 Scene Before the Dance on the Dish
 No. 42 Dance on the Dish
 No. 43 Scene After the Dance on the Dish
 No. 44 Entrance of the Herald and the Saltimbanque. Mounting of the Chinese Theater.
 No. 45 Herald's Announcement
 No. 46 Demon's Dance
 No. 47 Herald's Announcement
 No. 48 Dance with Scarves
 No. 49 Herald's Announcement
 No. 50 Umbrella Dance
 No. 51 Herald's Announcement
 No. 52 Ribbon Dance
 No. 53 Dismounting of the Chinese Theater
 No. 54 Boston Waltz
      Seventh Tableau
 No. 55 Conspiracy Scene
 No. 56 Taï-Choa's Scene with the Captain
      Eighth Tableau
 No. 57 Boston Waltz (Reprise)
 No. 58 Chinese Tea
 No. 59 Chinese Dance with the Cups
 No. 60 Dance with the Goblet
 No. 61 Scene of Alarm
 No. 62 Ship's Departure
 No. 63 Passing of the Armed Coolies
 No. 64 Riot Scene
 No. 65 Taï-Choa's Death

Apotheosis 
No. 66 - Apotheosis

Dances Added for the 1929 Leningrad Production 
 Variation in A Major
 Variation in B Major
 Variation of the Four Soloists
 Variation in G Major
 Eccentric Dance
 Chinese Generals (Children's Dance)
 Dance of the Little Drum
 Girls — American Dance
 Boston Waltz (Revised)

Characters 
 Harbormaster of the Port — L. A. Laschiline (1927) and Ivan Sidorov (1927), Alexei Bal'va (2010)
 Captain of the Soviet Ship — Alexeï D. Boulgakov and Mikhail Dudko (1927), Alexander Radunsky (1949 and 1957), Frederic Franklin (1943), Lukash Abrahamyan (2007), Igor Yebra (2010), Vito Mazzeo (2010), Vyacheslav Kapustin (2010)
 Taï-Choa, Comedian — Yekaterina Geltzer (1927), Viktorina Kriger (1927), Galina Ulanova (1949 and 1957), Olga Lepeshinskaya (1949), Alexandra Danilova (1943), Oksana Kucheruk (2010), Gaia Straccamore (2010), Anna Ol (2010)
 Li-Chan-Fou, Adventurer, Taï-Choa's Fiancé — Ivan Smoltsov (1927), Sergey Koren (1949 and 1957), Alexey Yermolayev (1949), Vito Mazzeo (2010), Manuel Paruccini (2010), Ivan Karnaukhov (2010), Farukh Ruzimatov (2015)
 Restaurant and Opium Den Patron — L. K. Matzkevitch (1927)
 Saltimbanque — V. A. Riabtzov (1927)
 First Overlord of the Coolies — A. V Orlov (1927)
 Chinese Conspirators — M. V. Orlov and I. F. Blokhine (1927)
 Herald of the Chinese Theater — Gherber (1927)
 Chinese Conjurer — Asaf Messerer (1927)
 Ma Lichen, introduced in the staging of 1949 — Yury Kondratov (1949 and 1957), Mikhail Gabovich (1949), Damiano Mongelli (2010)
 Nüwa, goddess of fertility, introduced in the staging of 2010 — Carla Fracci

References

External links 

 Film-ballet The Red Poppy produced by Czechoslovak TV in 1955, filmed in Studio Bratislava after performance of the Slovak National Theatre, choreography: R. Tomskij, Bolshoi Theatre Moscow)
 Rome Opera Theater's webpage on the ballet
 Pictures from 2010 Italian production
 Video clip from 2010 Italian production
 Short video clip from 2010 Italian production
 Russian Radio report on the Krasnoyarsk 2010 production

1927 ballet premieres
Ballets by Reinhold Glière
Ballets by Mikhail Kurilko
Ballets by Lev Lashchilin
Ballets by Vasily Tikhomirov
1927 compositions
Ballets premiered at the Bolshoi Theatre